S-15535 is a phenylpiperazine drug which is a potent and highly selective 5-HT1A receptor ligand that acts as an agonist and antagonist (weak partial agonist) at the presynaptic and postsynaptic 5-HT1A receptors, respectively. It has anxiolytic properties.

See also 
 Phenylpiperazine

References

External links

2-Aminoindanes
Eltoprazines